Jewell Parker Rhodes (born 1954 in Pittsburgh, Pennsylvania) is an American bestselling novelist and educator.

She is the author of several books for children including the New York Times bestsellers Black Brother, Black Brother and Ghost Boys, which has garnered over 30 awards and honors including The Walter Award, the Indies Choice/EB White Read-Aloud Award, and the Jane Addams Children’s Book Award for Older Readers. Rhodes is also the author of Paradise on Fire (winner of the Green Earth Book Award),  Towers Falling and the celebrated Louisiana Girls Trilogy, which includes Ninth Ward, winner of a Coretta Scott King Honor Award, Sugar, and Bayou Magic. Her novel Bayou Magic is featured in the third season of Apple TV+'s Emmy award-winning series Ghostwriter. Her latest novel for young readers, Treasure Island: Runaway Gold, releases in October 2023.

Rhodes has written six adult novels: Voodoo Dreams, Magic City, Douglass’ Women, Season, Moon, and Hurricane, as well as the memoir Porch Stories: A Grandmother’s Guide to Happiness, and two writing guides: Free Within Ourselves: Fiction Lessons for Black Authors and The African American Guide to Writing and Publishing Non-Fiction. A reissue of Magic City, a novel about the 1921 Tulsa Race Massacre, was released in 2021 in recognition of the 100th anniversary.

Jewell is a regular speaker at colleges and conferences. The driving force behind all of Jewell’s work is to inspire social justice, equity, and environmental stewardship.

Jewell is the Founding Artistic Director of the Virginia G. Piper Center for Creative Writing and Narrative Studies Professor and Virginia G. Piper Endowed Chair at Arizona State University. She was awarded an Honorary Doctorate of Humane Letters from Carnegie-Mellon University.

Early life
Rhodes was born and raised in Manchester, a largely African-American neighborhood on the North Side of Pittsburgh. As a child, she was a voracious reader. She began college as a drama major, but switched to writing when she discovered African-American literature for the first time. She received a Bachelor of Arts in Drama Criticism, a Master of Arts in English, and a Doctor of Arts in English (Creative Writing) from Carnegie Mellon University.

Writing

Her work has been published in China, Korea, France, Germany, Italy, Canada, Turkey, and the United Kingdom and reproduced in audio and for NPR's "Selected Shorts." She has been a featured speaker at the Runnymede International Literary Festival (University of London-Royal Holloway), Santa Barbara Writers Conference, Creative Nonfiction Writers Conference and Warwick University, among others.

Her recent fiction and essays have been anthologized in Rise Up Singing: Black Women Writers on Motherhood (ed., Berry), In Fact: The Best of Creative Nonfiction (ed. Gutkind), Gumbo (ed., Golden and Harris), and Children of the Night: Best Short Stories By Black Writers (ed., Naylor), along with others.

Many of Rhodes's middle grade novels focus on issues surrounding social justice within black communities throughout history and current events with themes of community. In particular, Ghost Boys, focuses on the racial injustices that pertain to the past and present with the main character experiencing police brutality and connecting with past . Rhodes's work promotes all people within a community to work together with collaborative, respectful, and empathetic manner, thus demonstrating how young readers start to self-reflect, seek information, and take action.

Bibliography

Middle Grade novels 
 Ninth Ward (2010)
 Sugar (2014)
 Bayou Magic (2015) 
 Towers Falling (2016)
 Ghost Boys (2018)
 Black Brother, Black Brother (2020)
 Paradise on Fire (2021)
 Los Chicos Fantasmas (Ghost Boys Spanish Edition) (2022)
 Treasure Island: Runaway Gold (2023)

Adult novels 
 Voodoo Dreams (1993)
 Magic City (1997)
 Douglass' Women (2002)
 Season (Formerly Voodoo Season) (2005)
 Moon (Formerly Yellow Moon) (2008)
 Hurricane (2011)

Nonfiction 
 Free Within Ourselves: Fiction Lessons for Black Authors (1999)
 The African American Guide to Writing and Publishing Non-Fiction (2001)
 Porch Stories: A Grandmother's Guide to Happiness (2006)

Awards and honors 

 2003: American Book Award (Douglass' Women)
 2003: Black Caucus of the American Library Award for Fiction (Douglass' Women)
 2003: PEN Oakland/Josephine Miles Literary Award
 2010: Parents' Choice Foundation Gold Award (Ninth Ward)
 2011: Coretta Scott King Honor Award (Ninth Ward)
 2014: Jane Addams Children's Book Award (Sugar)
 2018: E.B. White Read Aloud Award (Ghost Boys)
 2018: NAIBA Book of the Year (Ghost Boys)
 2019: Walter Dean Myers Award for Outstanding Children’s Literature in the Young Readers category (Ghost Boys) 
 2020: New England Book Award, Top 10 Kids' Indie Next Pick (Black Brother, Black, Brother)
 2021: Finalist, NAACP Image Award for Outstanding Literary Work for Youth/Teens (Black Brother, Black, Brother)
 2022: Green Earth Book Award (Paradise on Fire)
 2023: Octavia E. Butler Award

References

External links

  Jewell Parker Rhodes profile
 Jewell Parker Rhodes homepage

Writers from Pittsburgh
1954 births
Living people
20th-century American novelists
21st-century American novelists
American women novelists
Arizona State University faculty
Carnegie Mellon University alumni
African-American women writers
African-American novelists
20th-century American women writers
21st-century American women writers
American Book Award winners
Novelists from Pennsylvania
Novelists from Arizona